The Baloch of Sindh, also known as the Sindhi Balochs, is a community of Sindhi-speaking Baloch tribes living in the Northern part of Sindh province.

According to census records of 2017, the total population of Sindh is 47.89 million. Around 15% of the Sindhis population has ethnically Baloch ancestry. Baloch tribes own large agricultural land and related businesses in Sindh. Majority Baloch tribe are landlord in Sindh.

Talpur dynasty 
The Talpur dynasty (Sindhi: تالپردور, Balochi: تالپرء اوبادگ) was a Sindhi speaking Baloch tribe settled in Sindh and Balochistan who ruled the region. The Talpurs were ethnically Baloch and Shia Muslims by faith. They ruled from 1783 until 1843, when they were defeated by the British at the Battle of Miani and Battle of Dubbo. The northern Khairpur branch of the Talpur dynasty however, continued to maintain a degree of sovereignty during British rule as the princely state of Khairpur. Its ruler joined the new Dominion of Pakistan in October 1947 as an autonomous region in Pakistan.

History 
It is believed that the Balochs migrated from Balochistan during the Little Ice Age. The Little Ice Age is conventionally defined as a period extending from the sixteenth to the nineteenth centuries, or alternatively, from about 1300 to about 1850. Although climatologists and historians working with local records no longer expect to agree on either the start or end dates of this period, which varied according to local conditions.

According to Dr Akhtar Baloch of the University of Karachi, the climate of Balochistan was very cold and the region was uninhabitable during the winter so the Baloch people migrated in waves and settled in Sindh and Punjab.

Language 
Baloch of Sindh mostly migrated from Balochistan to Sindh from 16th to 19th century. Majority of Baloch forgot their language, intermingle with other ethnicities and now speak Sindhi and Saraiki languages. Baloch of border districts of Balochistan speak a mixed dialect of Sindhi and Balochi.

Sindhi Balochs are divided into two dialect speakers. Baloch of upper districts of Sindh speak Sulemani(eastern balochi) dialect of Balochi and lower districts like Karachi and other districts of Baloch speak  Makrani(southern balochi) dialect of Baloch. Some Balochs of Sindh also speak Saraiki and Sindhi as first language. A significant number of Baloch also speak Brahui. This language is  also spoken in central districts of Balochistan.

Notable people
 
 
Nabi Bakhsh Baloch
Faryal Talpur
Naveed Kamran Baloch
Naz Baloch
Sanam Baloch
Abdul Ghafoor Bhurgri
Abdul-Majid Bhurgri
Ghulam Muhammad Khan Bhurgri
Burhan Chandio
Kulsoom Akhtar Chandio 
Maula Bakhsh Chandio
Nawab Ghaibi Sardar Khan Chandio
Noon Meem Danish
Allah Bakhsh Gabol
 Mubeen Gabol
Nabil Gabol
Rafiq Ahmed Jamali
Ghulam Mustafa Jatoi
Liaquat Ali Jatoi
Muhammad Muqeem Khan Khoso
Shazia Khushk
Dr Javaid Laghari
Nadir Laghari
Sardar Nadir Akmal Khan Leghari
Khalid Ahmed Khan Lund 
Mir Nadir Ali Khan Magsi

Danish Nawaz
Yasir Nawaz
Asif Ali Zardari
Bilawal Bhutto Zardari

See also
 Bhagnari

References

Baloch tribes
Social groups of Sindh
Social groups of Pakistan